Spyridium scortechinii is a species of flowering plant in the family Rhamnaceae and is endemic to eastern Australia. It is a shrub with egg-shaped to narrowly elliptic leaves, and dense heads of white, woolly-hairy flowers with brown bracts at the base.

Description
The upper surface of the leaves is dark green and the lower surfaces in usually covered with greyish, woolly hairs. Flowering occurs from late winter to spring.

Taxonomy
This species was first formally described in 1884 by Ferdinand von Mueller who gave it the name Cryptandra scortechinii in The Australasian Chemist and Druggist, of specimens collected by Benedetto Scortechini near the Severn River. In 2004, Kevin Thiele changed the name to Spyridium scortechinii in the journal Telopea.

Distribution
Spyridium scortechinii is widespread from south-east Queensland to Bermagui in New South Wales, but mainly on the ranges.

References

scortechinii
Rosales of Australia
Flora of New South Wales
Flora of Queensland
Taxa named by Ferdinand von Mueller
Plants described in 1884